Tiru Dam, is an earthfill dam on Tiru river near Udgir, Latur district in the state of Maharashtra in India.

Specifications

Purpose
 Irrigation

See also
 Dams in Maharashtra
 List of reservoirs and dams in India

References

Dams in Latur district
Dams completed in 1976
1976 establishments in Maharashtra